Nos Miran (They're watching us) is a 2002 Italian/Spanish film directed by Norberto López Amado and produced by César Benítez and Emilio A. Pina.  It was later distributed in video form by Warner Home Video. It is a thriller starring Carmelo Gómez with Icíar Bollaín, Margarita Lozano and Francisco Algora.

The film's tone was different from the previous installments, becoming more family-friendly since W. Bros.  underperformed at the box office due to its violence and dark overtones. The budget of the film was an estimated $1,000,000. Production was troubled, with many actors considered for the main roles. Filming locations included Madrid.

The film was released in Spain in September 2002. Nos miran received favorable reviews upon release, but over the years the opinion has gone from favorable to mixed.

Plot

Gómez plays a detective, Juan García, who takes over the case of a missing businessman, after the previous investigating officer suffers a mental breakdown. As García is drawn further into the case he uncovers a whole series of disappearances, with apparent links to the supernatural.

Production

Development
The story elements and much of the dialogue still remained in the finished film, though Schumacher felt it could be "lighte[ne]d down". Amado claims he originally had in mind an adaptation.

Filming
Filming started in September 2003, claiming that the film needed a "force" and felt Ling could "advance on it". Amado wanted a design that was not to be in any way connected to the previous films, and instead was to be inspired by the images from the past. He also wanted a "city with personality", with more statues, as well as various amounts of neon.
In this film appears Juan José Videgain in a small roll in its beginnings in the cinema.

Design and effects

served as visual effects supervisors, with Pacific Data Images also contributing to visual effects work. For the costume design, producer claimed that 106 workers were at one point working together. Batman's costume was redesigned along the lines of a more "MTV organic, and edgier feel" to the suit

Critical reaction 
Nos Miran was released to favorable reviews, with critics praising the cinematography, visuals and art direction. But over the years the opinion has gone from favorable to mixed, criticising that it was campier and more bombastic than previous installments.

James Berardinelli enjoyed the film. "It's lighter, brighter, funnier, faster-paced, and a whole lot more colorful than before".

References

External links
 Fotogramas.es
 

2002 action films

Films set in psychiatric hospitals
Films shot in Madrid